Boonzaier is a Dutch-South African surname.  It may refer to:

 D. C. Boonzaier (1865–1950), South African cartoonist
Floretta Boonzaier (born 1974), South African psychologist 
 Gregoire Boonzaier (1909–2005), South African artist and son of D. C. Boonzaier